The 2022 J.League Cup, known as the  2022 J.League YBC Levain Cup for sponsorship reasons, was the 30th edition of J.League Cup, a Japanese association football cup competition. It began on 23 February 2022 and ended on 22 October that year.

Nagoya Grampus were the cup holders, having won their first title in 2021. They were eliminated in the quarter-finals by Urawa Red Diamonds.

Sanfrecce Hiroshima won their first League Cup title, beating Cerezo Osaka 2–1 in the final.

Format 
All 18 teams in the 2022 J1 League participated as well as the top two relegated teams from the 2021 league. Four clubs involved in the 2022 AFC Champions League received byes for the group and play-off stages: Kawasaki Frontale, Yokohama F. Marinos, Vissel Kobe, and Urawa Red Diamonds.

Sixteen teams played in the group stage. They were divided into four groups of four teams by their finish on the 2021 J1 and J2 Leagues (parenthesized below).

 Group A: Kashima Antlers (J1 4th), Cerezo Osaka (J1 12th), Gamba Osaka (J1 13th), Oita Trinita (J1 18th).
 Group B: Nagoya Grampus (J1 5th), Sanfrecce Hiroshima (J1 11th), Shimizu S-Pulse (J1 14th), Tokushima Vortis (J1 17th).
 Group C: Sagan Tosu (J1 7th), Hokkaido Consadole Sapporo (J1 10th), Kashiwa Reysol (J1 15th), Kyoto Sanga (J2 2nd).
 Group D: Avispa Fukuoka (J1 8th), FC Tokyo (J1 9th), Shonan Bellmare (J1 16th), Júbilo Iwata (J2 1st).

Schedule

Group stage
Each group were played on a home-and-away round-robin basis. Each match were played in 90 minutes. Each team played six times, twice against each opponent at home and away.

All times listed are in Japan Standard Time (JST, UTC+9).

Tiebreakers
In the group stage, teams in a group were ranked by points (3 points for a win, 1 point for a draw, 0 points for a loss). If the points were tied, the following tiebreakers were applied accordingly:

 Points in head-to-head matches among tied teams;
 Goal difference in head-to-head matches among tied teams;
 Goals scored in head-to-head matches among tied teams;
 Away goals scored in head-to-head matches among tied teams;

If more than two teams were tied, and applying all head-to-head criteria above remains a part of teams still tied, reapply the criteria above only for the tied teams.
 Goal difference in all group matches;
 Goals scored in all group matches;
 Penalty shoot-out if only two teams are tied and they meet in the last round of the group;
 Fewer disciplinary points;
 Drawing of lots.

Group A

Group B

Group C

Group D

Play-off stage

Summary
The play-off stage was played as two-legged ties of two teams each. The away goals rule, an extra time (away goals rule not applied for the scores in the extra time), and a penalty shoot-out were used if needed.

The play-off stage was held over two legs; on 4 (first), and 11 June 2022 (second). All times listed are in Japan Standard Time (JST, UTC+9).

|}

Matches

2–2 on aggregate. Avispa Fukuoka won on away goals.Sanfrecce Hiroshima won 4–1 on aggregate.Nagoya Grampus won 7–1 on aggregate.Cerezo Osaka won 5–1 on aggregate.Quarter-finals
The quarter-finals were played between four play-off winners and four teams qualified for the 2022 AFC Champions League as two-legged ties of two teams each. The away goals rule, an extra time (away goals rule not applied for the scores in the extra time), and a penalty shoot-out were used if needed.

The quarter-finals were held over two legs; on 3 (first) and 10 August 2022 (second). All times listed are in Japan Standard Time (JST, UTC+9). The draw was held on 29 June.

Summary

|}

MatchesUrawa Red Diamonds won 4–1 on aggregate.3–3 on aggregate. Cerezo Osaka won on away goals.Sanfrecce Hiroshima won 5–2 on aggregate.Avispa Fukuoka won 3–1 on aggregate.Semi-finals
The semi-finals were played between four quarter-final winners as two-legged ties of two teams each. The away goals rule, an extra time (away goals rule not applied for the scores in the extra time), and a penalty shoot-out would have been used if needed.

The semi-finals were held over two legs; on 21 (first) and 25 September 2022 (second). All times listed are in Japan Standard Time (JST, UTC+9). The draw was held on 10 August.

Summary

|}

MatchesCerezo Osaka won 5–1 on aggregate.Sanfrecce Hiroshima won 3–2 on aggregate.''

Final

This was Cerezo Osaka's third J.League Cup final and was seeking their second J.League Cup title (fifth with JSL Cup). This was also Sanfrecce Hiroshima's third J.League Cup final, losing the previous two.

Top scorers

References

External links 
Official website (in Japanese)

J.League Cup
2022 in Japanese football
2022 Asian domestic association football cups